Gazi Bulvarı is a light-rail station on the Konak Tram of the Tram İzmir system in İzmir, Turkey. It is located on Gazi Boulevard, from which the station gets its name. The station consists of an island platforms serving two tracks. 

Gazi Bulvarı station opened on 24 March 2018.

Connections
ESHOT operates city bus service on Gazi Boulevard.

Nearby Places of Interest
İzmir Stock Exchange

References

Railway stations opened in 2018
2018 establishments in Turkey
Konak District
Tram transport in İzmir